The Citizens League is a nonpartisan think tank based in the Minneapolis-St. Paul metropolitan area of Minnesota. It was established in 1952 as a good government advocacy and policy group.

The first Citizens League board of directors was elected on February 14, 1952; the League's first president was Stuart Leck.  Dues were $5.

In the past 68 years, the Citizens League has had only eight executive directors: Ray Black (1952–1958); Verne Johnson (1958–1967); Ted Kolderie (1967–1980); Curt Johnson (1980–1991); Lyle Wray (1992–2003); Sean Kershaw (2003–December 1, 2017); Pahoua Yang Hoffman (2017- May 15, 2020); Kate Cimino (2020–present).

Records

Records of the Citizens League are available for research use.  They include minutes (1971-1981), correspondence, reports (1958-1984), subject files, notebooks, financial information, and printed materials.

References

External links
Citizens League

Political organizations based in the United States
Organizations based in Minnesota
Think tanks established in 1952
Political and economic think tanks in the United States
1952 establishments in Minnesota